Pauline Hanson's One Nation – South Australia, or One Nation – South Australia, is the South Australia branch of Pauline Hanson's One Nation. Officially registered to the Electoral Commission of South Australia (ECSA) in September 2021, the party won a seat in the upper house of the South Australian Parliament in March 2022 at the state election, receiving over four percent of the vote. 

The party leader is Jennifer Game, a policy adviser to party leader Pauline Hanson, and mother to One Nation MLC Sarah Game. Although stating “in some ways I am quite conservative but I also think I’m very open-minded,” MLC Game has also said that “I just don’t probably like aligning myself with a particular label...”.

Election results

Members of parliament
 Sarah Game MLC (2022–present)

References

External links
One Nation official website 
 
 

South Australia
Political parties in South Australia